Yochelcionelloidea is an extinct superfamily of paleozoic molluscs of uncertain position (Gastropoda or Monoplacophora). The earliest yochelcionellids are known from the Middle Tommotian, but they are most diverse from the Botomian through the early Middle Cambrian.

2005 taxonomy 
The taxonomy of the Gastropoda by Bouchet & Rocroi, 2005:

Yochelcionelloidea
 † Yochelcionellidae
 † Stenothecidae
 † Trenellidae

2006-2007 taxonomy 
According to the opinion of P. Yu. Parkhaev is in the class Helcionelloida, subclass Archaeobranchia Parkhaev, 2001, Order Helcionelliformes Golikov & Starobogatov, 1975:

Superfamily Yochelcionelloidea Runnegar & Jell, 1976
Family Trenellidae Parkhaev, 2001
Family Yochelcionellidae Runnegar & Jell, 1976
Family Stenothecidae Runnegar & Jell, 1980
Subfamily Stenothecinae Runnegar & Jell, 1980
Subfamily Watsonellinae Parkhaev, 2001

References 

Helcionelloida